Walter Toscanini (March 19, 1898 - July, 1971) was an Italian-American historian and ballet choreographer. He was the son of Maestro Arturo Toscanini and Carla De Martini, and brother of Wanda Toscanini. He was married to Lucia Fornaroli, a La Scala ballerina. His son was Walfredo Toscanini (1929 - 2011).

Work book 
 Cia Fornaroli and Walter Toscanini papers, 1953

Walter Toscanini and Lucia Fornaroli collected more than 3,300 dance related items, including prints, paintings, writings, which Toscanini then donated to the New York Public Library Jerome Robbins Dance Division, where it is entitled the Cia Fornaroli Collection.

See also 
 Arturo Toscanini
 Wanda Toscanini
 Vladimir Horowitz

References

Site link 
 
 Walter Toscanini
 Cia Fornaroli and Walter Toscanini papers

1898 births
1971 deaths
Italian emigrants to the United States
Italian choreographers
American broadcasters